Miss Smith Goes to Nashville is the third studio album by American country singer Connie Smith. It was released in March 1966 via RCA Victor Records and contained 12 tracks. The album contained original material including several tracks penned by Smith's mentor Bill Anderson. Miss Smith Goes to Nashville reached number two on the country LP's chart in 1966 and included the top five singles "Nobody But a Fool (Would Love You)" and "If I Talk to Him".

Background
In 1964, Connie Smith's debut single titled "Once a Day" reached number one on the American country songs chart for eight weeks. The song propelled Smith's career and would be followed by a series of top ten country singles during the decade. RCA Victor had issued two studio albums of Smith's material prior to the release of Miss Smith Goes to Nashville. Smith and producer Bob Ferguson began the process of creating her next album project in August 1965. Ferguson named the album Miss Smith Goes to Nashville after the Jimmy Stewart film Mr. Smith Goes to Washington.

Recording and content
Miss Smith Goes to Nashville was recorded at RCA Studio B, located in Nashville, Tennessee. All sessions were produced by Bob Ferguson and took place between March 17 and November 2, 1965. The album contained a total of 12 tracks. Smith's future record producer, Ray Baker, brought a demo of the song "If You Won't Tell" by songwriter Dallas Frazier. Smith liked the track and recorded it for the project. She has since recorded more than 50 songs by Frazier. Singer and musician Jerry Reed pitched Smith the track "If I Talk to Him". The song had been co-written by his wife Priscilla Mitchell. Ferguson believed the song had potential to be a single and had Smith include it on the album. 

Three tracks composed by Bill Anderson also appeared on the record, including the single "Nobody But a Fool (Would Love You)". Anderson had originally discovered Smith and composed "Once a Day" for her. Miss Smith Goes to Nashville also featured Smith's first self-penned track called "I'll Never Get Over Loving You". "I'd had a publisher tell me it wasn't good enough to record, but then I played it for Bob Ferguson and he liked it well enough," Smith said of the self-composed song.

Release and chart performance

Miss Smith Goes to Nashville was originally released in March 1966 on the RCA Victor label. It was the third studio offering of Smith's career. The album was originally distributed as a vinyl LP, containing six songs on both sides of the record. Decades later, the original LP was re-issued to digital and streaming markets including Apple Music. In its original release, Miss Smith Goes to Nashville spent 20 weeks on the Billboard Country LP's chart, peaking at number two in May 1966. The disc included two singles. "If I Talk to Him" was first released as a single by RCA Victor in August 1965. The song climbed to the number four position on the Billboard Hot Country Songs chart in November 1965. It was followed by "Nobody But a Fool (Would Love You)" in January 1966. The single also reached number four on the country songs chart. The album was given four out of five stars from AllMusic.

Track listings

Vinyl version

Digital version

Personnel
All credits are adapted from the liner notes of Miss Smith Goes to Nashville.

Musical personnel

 Kenneth Buttrey – drums
 Dorothy Dillard – background vocals
 Ray Edenton – guitar
 Dolores Edgin – background vocals
 Walter Haynes – bass guitar, guitar
 Kelso Herston – guitar
 Priscilla Hubbard – background vocals
 Roy Huskey – bass
 Millie Kirkham – background vocals
 Jimmy Lance – guitar

 Leonard Miller – drums
 Weldon Myrick – steel guitar
 Louis Nunley – background vocals
 Jerry Reed – guitar
 Hargus "Pig" Robbins – piano
 Connie Smith – lead vocals
 Gordon Stoker – background vocals
 Henry Strzelecki – bass
 Ray Walker – background vocals
 William Wright – background vocals

Technical personnel
 Bob Ferguson – Producer
 Al Pachucki – Engineer

Chart performance

Release history

References

1966 albums
Connie Smith albums
RCA Victor albums
Albums produced by Bob Ferguson (music)